The canton of Marmande-1 is an administrative division of the Lot-et-Garonne department, southwestern France. It was created at the French canton reorganisation which came into effect in March 2015. Its seat is in Marmande.

It consists of the following communes:
 
Beaupuy
Cocumont
Couthures-sur-Garonne
Gaujac
Marcellus
Marmande (partly)
Meilhan-sur-Garonne
Montpouillan
Sainte-Bazeille
Saint-Sauveur-de-Meilhan

References

Cantons of Lot-et-Garonne